Sir Alexander John Dickson Stirling  (20 October 1927 – 16 July 2014) was a British diplomat who was the UK's first ambassador to Bahrain, later ambassador to Iraq, Tunisia and Sudan.

Career
Stirling was educated at Edinburgh Academy, served with the Royal Air Force in Egypt 1945–48, then read Modern Languages at Lincoln College, Oxford. In 1951 he joined the Foreign Office and was sent to learn Arabic at the Middle East Centre for Arab Studies, after which he served at Beirut, Cairo, Baghdad and as consul at Amman. He was posted to the British Embassy at Santiago 1965–67 and led the UK Delegation to the fourth Antarctic Treaty Consultative Meeting in 1966.

After serving at the Foreign Office 1967–69 Stirling was posted as Political Agent to Bahrain, which had been under British protection since 1860. Bahrain declared independence in 1971 and Stirling became the first British ambassador to Bahrain. He was posted to Beirut again as Counsellor 1972–75, then attended the Royal College of Defence Studies before being appointed Ambassador to Iraq 1977–80,

On 19 June 1980 he survived an assassination attempt: three terrorists burst into the embassy at Baghdad and fired three shots at him, one of which passed across his chest and through the lapel of his jacket. After Iraq, Stirling was ambassador to Tunisia 1981–84 and to Sudan 1984–86.

Stirling then retired from the Diplomatic Service and for 20 years worked with the charity SOS Sahel, as a member of its Council and as Chairman 1993–97.

Honours
Stirling was appointed CMG in the New Year Honours of 1976 and knighted KBE in the Queen's Birthday Honours of 1981.

References

Sources
Sir Alexander Stirling - obituary, The Telegraph, London, 1 September 2014
Sir Alexander Stirling (obituary), The Times, London, 9 September 2014

1927 births
2014 deaths
People educated at Edinburgh Academy
Royal Air Force officers
Alumni of Lincoln College, Oxford
Ambassadors of the United Kingdom to Bahrain
Ambassadors of the United Kingdom to Iraq
Ambassadors of the United Kingdom to Tunisia
Ambassadors of the United Kingdom to Sudan
Knights Commander of the Order of the British Empire
Companions of the Order of St Michael and St George